Henry Breault (14 October 1900 – 5 December 1941) was a United States Navy submarine sailor who received the Medal of Honor for his actions while serving aboard the submarine . He was the first submariner and he remains the only enlisted submariner to be awarded the Medal of Honor for actions aboard a United States submarine.

Biography
Henry Breault was born in Putnam, Connecticut, on 14 October 1900. During World War I he enlisted in the British Royal Navy at sixteen years of age and, after serving under the White Ensign for four years, joined the U.S. Navy.

On 28 October 1923, Torpedoman Second Class Breault was a member of the crew of  when that submarine was sunk in a collision in the Panama Canal. Though he could have escaped, Breault chose to assist a shipmate and remained inside the sunken submarine until both were rescued more than a day later. For his "heroism and devotion to duty" on this occasion, Henry Breault was awarded the Medal of Honor. He received his Medal of Honor from President Calvin Coolidge, in ceremonies at the White House, Washington, D.C., on 8 March 1924.

Following twenty years of U.S. Navy service, Henry Breault became ill with a heart condition. He died at the Naval Hospital at Newport, Rhode Island, on 5 December 1941, two days before the attack on Pearl Harbor brought on U.S. entry into World War II. He was buried in Saint Mary Cemetery in Putnam, Connecticut.

Petty Officer Breault was the first submariner to receive the Medal of Honor and the only enlisted man to receive the Medal of Honor for heroism while serving as a submariner.  Seven submarine commanders received the Medal of Honor during World War II.  Master Chief Petty Officer William R. Charette received the Medal of Honor for heroism while a Navy corpsman during the Korean War and later joined the submarine service.

Medal of Honor action

The steamship SS Abangarez, owned by the United Fruit Company and captained by Master W.A. Card, was underway toward Dock No. 6 at Cristobal. Through a series of maneuvering errors and miscommunication, the SS Abangarez collided with O-5 and struck the submarine on the starboard side of the control room, opening a hole some ten feet long and penetrating the number one main ballast tank.

The steamship picked up eight survivors – including the commanding officer – who had either been topside or climbed up quickly through the conning tower hatch. Nearby tugs and ships rescued several others. Eight minutes after O-5 sank, Chief Machinist's Mate C.R. Butler surfaced in an air bubble. In all, 16 crewmen were rescued. Five were missing: Chief Electrician's Mate Lawrence T. Brown, Torpedoman's Mate Second Class Henry Breault, plus three others.

Henry Breault had been working in the torpedo room when the collision occurred, and he headed up the ladder topside. As he gained the main deck, he realized that Chief Brown was asleep below. Instead of going over the side, Breault headed back below to get Brown and shut the deck hatch over his head just as the bow went under. Brown was awake, but unaware of the order to abandon ship. Both men headed aft to exit through Control, but the water coming into the Forward Battery compartment made that escape route unusable. They made it through the rising water to the torpedo room and had just shut and dogged the door when the battery shorted and exploded. Breault knew the bow was under, and they were trapped.

Salvage efforts began immediately, and divers were sent down from a salvage tug that arrived from Coco Solo. By 10:00 am, they were on the bottom examining the wreck. To search for trapped personnel, they hammered on the hull near the aft end of the ship and worked forward. Upon reaching the torpedo room, they heard answering hammer blows from inside the boat. In those days before modern safety and rescue devices, the only way the salvage crew, under the command of Captain Amos Bronson Jr., could get the men out of the boat was to lift it physically from the mud using cranes or pontoons. There were no pontoons within  of the site, but two of the largest crane barges in the world, Ajax and Hercules, were in the Canal Zone. They had been built specifically for handling the gates of the canal locks. However, there had been a landslide at the famous Gaillard Cut, and both barges were on the other side of the slide, assisting in clearing the Canal. The excavation shifted into high gear and by 2:00 pm on the afternoon of the sinking, the crane barge Ajax squeezed through and was on its way to the O-5 site.

Divers worked to tunnel under O-5 bow so lifting cables could be attached. Ajax arrived about midnight, and by early morning, the cable tunnel had been dug, the cable run, and a lift was attempted. Sheppard J. Shreaves, supervisor of the Panama Canal's salvage crew and himself a qualified diver, had been working continuously throughout the night to dig the tunnel, snake the cable under the submarine, and hook it to Ajax's hoist. Now the lift began. As the crane took a strain, the lift cables broke. Shreaves and his crew worked another cable set under the bow and again Ajax pulled. Again, the cable broke. All through the day, the men worked. Shreaves had been in his diving suit nearly 24 hours. As noon on 29 October approached, the crane was ready for another lift, this time with buoyancy being added by blowing water out of the flooded Engine Room. Then, just after noontime, the bow of O-5 broke the surface. Men from the salvage force quickly opened the torpedo room hatch, and Breault and Brown emerged into the fresh air.

Brown's account

Award Recommendation Path 
The Commanding Officer of the O-5, LT Avery, began the award process, initially recommended Breault for a Navy Cross. Avery submitted his recommendation on 19 November 1923, citing Article 1709 of the 1920 Navy Regulation Book as a reference. The recommendation reads:1.           In view of the extraordinary heroism displayed by Breault, H., TM2c, when the O-5 was sunk in collision with the S.S. ABANGAREZ, it is earnestly recommended that the above named man be awarded the Navy Cross.

2.           The following is a history of the extraordinary heroism displayed by Breault:

At 6:24 on the morning of October 28, the O-5 collided with the S.S. ABANGAREZ, and sank in less than one minute. Breault at the time of the collision was in the torpedo room. As soon as the collision occurred he went up the torpedo room hatch and looked out on deck. Upon his arrival at the top of the hatch he saw the boat was sinking very fast and instead of jumping overboard as a number of the crew had already done, thereby trying to save his own life, he went back to the torpedo room, closed the torpedo room hatch on himself, and the assisted Brown, another member of the crew who had been trapped in the boat, to close the water-tight door between the forward battery compartment and the torpedo room. By the time this door was closed the boat had sunk in forty feet of water with every compartment flooded except the torpedo room. Breault and Brown remained trapped in this compartment until they were rescued thirty-one hours later by the salvage party. During this time their efforts were concentrated on stopping leaks between the forward battery and the torpedo room.

3.           The conduct displayed by Breault by casting all personal safety aside when he saw that the O-5 was sinking fast and going below to close the torpedo room hatch and even closing same while water was coming into the compartment showed that his devotion to duty was of the highest order. The Commanding Officer therefore earnestly recommends that he be awarded a Navy Cross in recognition of this action, so in keeping with the best traditions of the Navy.Avery forwarded his recommendation to the Commander of Submarine Division Eight, R. H. English. English reviewed it and added the Commander of the Submarine Force, A. Bronson to the recommendation. They both concurred with Avery's assessment on 23 November 1923, and forwarded their recommendations to the Control Force Commander, RADM Montgomery M. Taylor. Taylor felt Breault was more deserving, Taylor's recommendation reads:The Commander Control Force is of the opinion that the unusual heroic conduct of Breault and his devotion to duty, particularly in that he almost surely saved Brown's life at the risk of his own and in that his devotion to duty saved a [considerable] loss of Government property, deserves recognition. Accordingly, it is requested that Breault be recommended for the Congressional Medal of Honor.While Taylor was not the originator, his recommendation to award the Medal of Honor superseded all other recommendations and changed the nature of the award. Secretary of the Navy Edwin Denby concurred with Taylor's assessment that awarding a Medal of Honor was merited ordered General Order No. 125 to be drafted.

Medal of Honor citation 

For his role in the rescue, Sheppard Shreaves later received the Congressional Life Saving Medal, presented personally by Breault and Brown that same year.

Awards
Medal of Honor
Navy Good Conduct Medal
American Defense Service Medal
British War Medal (United Kingdom)
Victory Medal (United Kingdom)
Yangtze Service Medal

See also

List of Medal of Honor recipients
List of Medal of Honor recipients in non-combat incidents

Notes

Citations

References

United States Navy Medal of Honor recipients
Royal Navy personnel of World War I
United States Navy sailors
People from Putnam, Connecticut
1900 births
1941 deaths
Non-combat recipients of the Medal of Honor
Burials in Connecticut
Military personnel from Connecticut